Princess Marcelina Czartoryska, née Radziwiłł (18 May 1817 in Podłużne − 5 June 1894 in Kraków) was a prominent Polish aristocrat and pianist.

Life
Born into the mighty Polish magnate family, the Radziwiłłs, in 1840 she married Aleksander Czartoryski, an aristocrat from a family of no lesser notability.

She was taught piano by Carl Czerny in Vienna and by Frédéric Chopin in Paris.  She gave concerts across Europe, often with prominent musicians such as Franz Liszt, Pauline Viardot and Henri Vieuxtemps.

In Paris she became a prominent guest at the Hôtel Lambert, bought by Prince Adam Jerzy Czartoryski, a close relative of her husband Aleksander. In 1849 she was present at the deathbed of her teacher and friend, Frédéric Chopin.

From 1870 she lived in Kraków, where she gave mainly private concerts and, thanks to her artistic connections, contributed to founding a Conservatory in 1888. She died in 1894 and was buried at the Rakowicki Cemetery.

References

Bibliography
Stanisław Dybowski, Słownik pianistów polskich (Dictionary of Polish Pianists), Przedsiębiorstwo Muzyczne "Selene", Warsaw, 2003.
Stanisław Tarnowski, Księżna Marcelina Czartoryska,Kraków,1895.

1817 births
1894 deaths
Marcelina
Academy of Music in Kraków
Musicians from Kraków
Polish classical pianists
Polish women pianists
Radziwiłł family
Pupils of Frédéric Chopin
19th-century composers
19th-century classical pianists
19th-century Polish musicians
Women classical pianists
19th-century women composers
19th-century women pianists